Nomadic conflict, also called farmer–herder conflict, is a type of environmental conflict where farming and herding communities overlap and has been used to refer to fighting among herding communities or fighting between herding and farming communities. This is sometimes referred to as conflict involving “pastoralists” or “nomadic” people and “agriculturalists” or “settled” people. The conflicts usually arise from destruction of crops by livestock and is exacerbated during times when water and lands to graze are scarce.

Background
There are several hundred million pastoralists worldwide and Africa contains about 268 million pastoralists, over a quarter of its population, who live on about 43 percent of the continent’s land mass.

Commercial displacement
Displacement of local communities to make way for commercial farms or mining activities has put pressure on grazing areas, exacerbating conflict.

Climate change and land degradation
Desertification means the Sahel, where much of the conflict between herders and farmers take place, is expanding southward by about 1400 square miles a year. Climate change has been attributed to exacerbate land degradation, which leads to more competition over grazing areas.

Examples

Cameroon
More than 30,000 people in northern Cameroon fled to Chad after ethnic clashes over access to water between Musgum fishermen and ethnic Arab Choa herders in December 2021.

Central African Republic

In the Central African Republic Civil War, a large portion of the fighting was between rebel groups known as ex-Séléka and rebel groups known as anti-balaka. While the ex-Séléka consisted of those who were largely Muslim and the anti-balaka consisted of those who were largely Christian and animist, an added dimension of the conflict was that ex-Séléka consisted of those from nomadic groups, such as the Fulani, Gula and Runga, and the anti-balaka consisted of those from agriculturalist groups.

Congo, Democratic Republic of

Ethnic conflict in Kivu has often involved the Congolese Tutsis known as Banyamulenge, a cattle herding group that largely migrated from Rwanda in the 19th century and are often derided as outsiders. They are pitted against other ethnic groups who consider themselves indigenous. Militias drawn from the Bembe, Bafuliru and Banyindu have attacked and stolen cattle from the Banyamulenge.

Kenya

Nigeria

Sudan and South Sudan

Nomadic conflict in Sudan has been a part of the Second Sudanese Civil War, the War in Darfur and the Sudanese conflict in South Kordofan and Blue Nile and has been a feature in ethnic violence in South Sudan.

References

Nomads
Social conflict
Environmental sociology